Pushpa Preeya also known as either Pushpa NM  or Pushpa N. M. is an Indian scribe, IT professional, social activist and volunteer. She is well known for her voluntary service of writing exams for visually impaired people.

Biography 
She was born and raised up in Bangaluru, Karnataka. She comes from a very humble background facing financial difficulties at her young age. She also revealed that she and her brother had to beat all obstacles and odds to build a life for themselves during an interview with India Times.

Career 

Pushpa pursued her career as an exam scribe in 2007 and it was one of her friends who motivated her to write exams for differently abled people. In 2007, she responded to the request of few NGOs to write exams for blind people. She also completed diploma in computer science and pursued master's degree from the Indira Gandhi National Open University.

As of 2019, she was reported to have completed writing over 1000 exams for visually impaired people since 2007. She also maintains a Facebook blog page for blood donors. She received the Nari Shakti Puraskar for the year 2018 from the Indian President Ram Nath Kovind on 8 March 2019 coinciding with the International Women's Day.

See also 

 List of people from Karnataka

References 

Living people
Scribes
Indian activists
21st-century Indian women
21st-century Indian people
People from Karnataka
People from Bangalore
Indira Gandhi National Open University alumni
Year of birth missing (living people)